Christian Brittig (born 27 March 1966) is a German ice hockey player. He competed in the men's tournament at the 1988 Winter Olympics.

References

External links
 

1966 births
Living people
German ice hockey players
Olympic ice hockey players of West Germany
Ice hockey players at the 1988 Winter Olympics
Sportspeople from Landshut